A Hero Ain't Nothin' but a Sandwich may refer to:
 A Hero Ain't Nothin' but a Sandwich (novel)
 A Hero Ain't Nothin' but a Sandwich (film)